Heyo a.k.a. Arinua (Arinwa, Arima) is a Torricelli language of Papua New Guinea. It is also known as Lolopani and Ruruhip. The name Ruruhip is also shared with Yahang, which is closely related.

See also
Wanib Sign Language

References

Maimai languages
Languages of Sandaun Province
Languages of East Sepik Province